Aleksander of Malonne or Alexander of Malonne was a twelfth-century Walloon bishop of Płock, Poland.

 He was bishop from 1129 to 1156 AD and was responsible for the construction of the current Cathedral of Płock in 1144. Aleksander is depicted in a figurative bas-relief on the original cathedral doors now in Velikiy Novgorod. Depiction here is a copy currently hanging in Płock.

References

Bishops of Płock
Year of birth unknown
1156 deaths
12th-century Roman Catholic bishops in Poland